Gerardo Elías Cortés Hermosilla (born 17 May 1988) is a Chilean footballer who currently plays for Chilean Segunda División side San Antonio Unido.

Honours

Club
Colo-Colo
 Primera División de Chile (1): 2009 Clausura

International
Chile
 FIFA U20 World Cup (1): Third place 2007

References

External links
 Cortés at Football Lineups
 

1988 births
Living people
People from Concepción, Chile
People from Concepción Province, Chile
People from Biobío Region
Sportspeople from Concepción, Chile
Chilean footballers
Chile youth international footballers
Chile under-20 international footballers
Chilean Primera División players
Primera B de Chile players
Segunda División Profesional de Chile players
Deportes Concepción (Chile) footballers
Ñublense footballers
Colo-Colo footballers
Unión Española footballers
Club Deportivo Palestino footballers
San Marcos de Arica footballers
Deportes La Serena footballers
Santiago Morning footballers
Coquimbo Unido footballers
Deportes Melipilla footballers
Deportes Colchagua footballers
San Antonio Unido footballers
Association football midfielders
21st-century Chilean people